Major General Vivian Henry Bruce Majendie,  (20 April 1886 – 13 January 1960) was a British Army officer and amateur cricketer for Somerset County Cricket Club.

Military career
The son of The Reverend Henry Majendie, Vivian Majendie was educated at Winchester College and the Royal Military College, Sandhurst. He was commissioned into the Somerset Light Infantry in 1905. He developed a career as a cricketer and played for Somerset and Devon. He served with the West African Frontier Force in Southern Nigeria from 1908 to 1913 and then in India from 1913 to 1914.

Majendie fought in the First World War, moving with his battalion to France in 1915. He married the following year, and was awarded the Distinguished Service Order in 1917. He ended the war in 1918 as officer commanding the 1st Battalion, Somerset Light Infantry, serving in France as part of the British Expeditionary Force (BEF).

After the war, Majendie became commander of the Amiens Sub Area of France and then, after attending the Staff College, Camberley from 1920 to 1921, became brigade major for the 14th Infantry Brigade in Curragh in 1922 before becoming a General Staff Officer at the Royal Military College, Sandhurst. In 1924 he was appointed a Staff Officer to Inspector General of the West African Frontier Force and in 1929 he became commanding officer of the 2nd Battalion, Somerset Light Infantry. After attending the Imperial Defence College in 1932, he returned to the Staff College at Camberley as a General Staff Officer (GSO) in 1933 and then was made Director of Military Training at GHQ India in 1936. He was appointed General Officer Commanding (GOC) the 55th (West Lancashire) Infantry Division, a Territorial Army (TA) formation, in 1938, and the same year became Colonel of the Somerset Light Infantry. In 1939, with war in Europe deemed likely, the division split to form a second-line duplicate formation, the 59th (Staffordshire) Infantry Division.

Majendie served from the outbreak of the Second World War in September 1939 until June 1941 as GOC the 55th Division, which in late June 1940 was reorganised as an infantry division and served in the United Kingdom throughout the war. By now believed to be too old for field command, he relinquished command of the 55th Division to Major- eneral William Morgan, became GOC Northern Ireland District in 1941 and served in the War Office as President of the War Office Regular Commissions Board from 1943. He retired from the army, after a career spanning well over 40 years, in 1946 and ceased being Colonel of his regiment the following year. He became Deputy Lieutenant for the county of Hertfordshire in 1951.

Bibliography

References

External links
British Army Officers 1939–1945
Generals of World War II

|-

|-

1886 births
1960 deaths
British Army major generals
Somerset Light Infantry officers
British Army personnel of World War I
British Army generals of World War II
Companions of the Order of the Bath
Companions of the Distinguished Service Order
English cricketers
Devon cricketers
Somerset cricketers
Graduates of the Staff College, Camberley
Royal West African Frontier Force officers
British expatriates in Nigeria
British expatriates in India
People from colonial Nigeria
Graduates of the Royal College of Defence Studies
Graduates of the Royal Military College, Sandhurst
People educated at Winchester College
Deputy Lieutenants of Hertfordshire
War Office personnel in World War II
Academics of the Royal Military College, Sandhurst
Academics of the Staff College, Camberley
Military personnel from Devon
British Army cricketers